Municipal House is a civic building that houses Smetana Hall, a celebrated concert venue, in Prague. It is located on Náměstí Republiky next to the Powder Gate in the centre of the city.

History
The Royal Court palace used to be located on the site of the Municipal House. From 1383 until 1485 the King of Bohemia lived in the property. After 1485, it was abandoned. It was demolished in the early 20th century. Construction of the current building started in 1905. It opened in 1912. The building was designed by Osvald Polívka and Antonín Balšánek.

The Municipal House was the location of the Czechoslovak declaration of independence.

The roof of the building was the location for the INXS music video for their huge hit New Sensation.

Architecture and art
The building is of the Art Nouveau architecture style. The building exterior has allegorical art and stucco. There is a mosaic called Homage to Prague by Karel Špillar over the entrance. On either side are allegorical sculpture groups representing The Degradation of the People and The Resurrection of the People by Ladislav Šaloun. Smetana Hall serves as a concert hall and ballroom. It has a glass dome. It houses artwork by Alfons Mucha, Jan Preisler and Max Švabinský.

Today
Today, the building is used as concert hall, ballroom, civic building, and includes a café to the left of the lobby and a French restaurant on the right side. Beneath the ground there is also a wine bar and an American bar. Many of the rooms in the building are closed to the public and open only for guided tours.

Gallery

Footnotes

Sources 
 Peter Cannon-Brookes Czech Sculpture, 1800–1938

External links

 Official website

Osvald Polívka buildings
Music venues in Prague
Concert halls in the Czech Republic
Czech nationalism
Music venues completed in 1912
Event venues established in 1912
National Cultural Monuments of the Czech Republic
Domes
Art Nouveau architecture in Prague
Art Nouveau theatres
1912 establishments in Austria-Hungary